Mariano Osmar Arzamendia Espinoza (born 19 January 1998) is a Paraguay international footballer who plays for Club Olimpia as a goalkeeper.

Career
Born in Misiones Department, Arzamendia began playing football in Olimpia's youth academy.

International
He was called up to Paraguay U20 squad in 2017 South American Youth Football Championship.

References

External links

1998 births
Living people
Paraguayan footballers
Club Olimpia footballers
Deportivo Santaní players
Sportivo Luqueño players
12 de Octubre Football Club players
Club Sportivo San Lorenzo footballers
Paraguayan Primera División players
Association football goalkeepers